Kikka may refer to:

 Kikka, Estonia, a village in Estonia
 Kikka Hanazawa (born 1970), Japanese investor and fashion industry executive
 Kikka Sirén (1964–2005), Finnish singer
 Nakajima Kikka, a Japanese jet aircraft

See also
 Kika (disambiguation)
 Kikas (disambiguation)
 Kikkas